Ferenc Polikárp Zakar Ocist. (8 June 1930 – 17 September 2012) was a Hungarian abbot of the Cistercians of Common Observance. Between 1985-1995 he was in office as 80the General Abbot, and was succeeded by Maurus Esteva Alsina.

Zakar was born in Zmajevo, Yugoslavia.  He served as abbot of Zirc Abbey from 1996 to 2010.  He died, aged 82, in Budapest, Hungary.

References

1930 births
2012 deaths
Hungarian abbots
Hungarian Cistercians
Cistercian abbots general